The Difference Between Hell and Home is the third studio album by Canadian melodic hardcore band Counterparts. It was released on July 24, 2013, through Victory Records. The album received positive critical reception, generating an aggregated score of 79/100 on Metacritic, indicating "generally favorable reviews".

Critical reception 

The album received positive reviews by critics. Rock Sound concluded their review by saying "This is raw feeling, distilled through true musicianship – exactly as great hardcore should be" and Thrash Hits stated "The Difference Between Hell and Home is a stunningly complete hardcore album which should be treasured by anyone with half a brain in their heads" and awarded the album with a rating of five-and-a-half stars out of six.
The album currently holds a rating of 79/100 on Metacritic.

Track listing 
All lyrics written by Brendan Murphy

Personnel 
Counterparts
 Brendan Murphy – lead vocals
 Alex Re – guitar, backing vocals, clean vocals 
 Jesse Doreen – guitar/drum programming
 Eric Bazinet – bass guitar

Production
 Will Putney – Production, engineer, mixing, mastering
 Randy LeBoeuf – additional engineering

References 

2013 albums
Counterparts (band) albums
Victory Records albums
Albums produced by Will Putney